Chloroclystis sphragitis is a moth in the  family Geometridae. It is endemic to New Zealand, where it has been recorded in both the North and South Islands. It was first described by Edward Meyrick in 1888 using specimens collected in Wellington and Christchurch in February.

Adults are highly variable, the colouring resembling bird droppings. The forewings are pale ochreous with a narrow darker area at the base followed by a narrow oblique pale band, then a broad central band, a rather narrow curved pale band and finally several small irregular patches on the termen. The hindwings are pale ochreous with numerous wavy, pale brown lines on the dorsum. Adults are on wing from September to February.

References

Moths described in 1888
sphragitis
Moths of New Zealand
Endemic fauna of New Zealand
Endemic moths of New Zealand